Nicotinic acid N-oxide is an organic compound with the formula (HO2C)C5H4NO.  It is the N-oxide of nicotinic acid ((HO2C)C5H4N).  It is prepared by oxidation of nicotinic acid or the hydrolysis of 3-cyanopyridine N-oxide.  The compound is a precursor to the popular drugs niflumic acid and pranoprofen.

References

Amine oxides
Pyridinium compounds
Carboxylic acids